Concert in the Garden is the fourth studio album by American jazz composer Maria Schneider. The album was released in 2004 by ArtistShare and won the Grammy Award for Best Large Jazz Ensemble Album in 2005.

In 2019, the album was selected by the Library of Congress for preservation in the National Recording Registry for being "culturally, historically, or aesthetically significant".

Background
Schneider's three previous albums were nominated for Grammy Awards, but the previous one, Allégresse, was released four years before Concert in the Garden. The delay has been attributed to the financial difficulty of recording with large groups, which are required for the music that Schneider writes.

Compared to previous albums, this album is more classical than jazz, with a greater influence of Brazilian, Spanish, and flamenco music.

Reception
The JazzTimes review was mostly positive, stating, "Three Romances" and "Buleria, Solea y Rumba" "are revelatory in their complete realization", but the solos on the other pieces "are not strong enough to provide sufficient contrast to the piece's slow, hovering progress".

The Penguin Guide to Jazz gave the album a maximum four stars and added it to the book's Core Collection. It stated that the title-track was “a slight disappointment”, but overall the album was "the great achievement of her career so far."

Legacy
The album was inducted into the National Recording Registry in 2019.

Track listing

Personnel

 Maria Schneider – conductor
 Charles Pillow – alto and soprano saxophones, clarinet, flute, oboe, English horn
 Tim Ries – alto and soprano saxophones, clarinet, alto and bass flutes
 Rich Perry – tenor saxophone, flute
 Donny McCaslin – tenor and soprano saxophones, clarinet, flute
 Scott Robinson – baritone saxophone, flute, bass clarinet, contrabass clarinet
 Tony Kadleck – trumpet, flügelhorn
 Greg Gisbert – trumpet, flügelhorn
 Laurie Frink – trumpet, flügelhorn
 Ingrid Jensen – trumpet, flügelhorn
 Keith O'Quinn – trombone
 Rock Ciccarone – trombone
 Larry Farrell – trombone
 George Flynn – bass trombone, contrabass trombone
 Ben Monder – guitar
 Frank Kimbrough – piano
 Jay Anderson – double bass
 Clarence Penn – drums
 Jeff Ballard – cajón and quinto cajón on "Bulería, Soleá y Rumba" (stereo right)
 Gonzalo Grau – cajón on "Bulería, Soleá y Rumba" (stereo left)
 Gary Versace – accordion on "Concert in the Garden"
 Luciana Souza – voice on "Concert in the Garden" and "Bulería, Soleá y Rumba". Voice and pandeiro on "Choro Dançado"
 Pete McGuinness – trombone on "Pas de Deux" and "Dança Ilusória"
 Andy Middleton – tenor saxophone on "Pas de Deux" and "Dança Ilusória"

References

External links
 Maria Schneider.com - Concert in the Garden

2004 albums
Big band albums
Grammy Award for Best Large Jazz Ensemble Album
Maria Schneider (musician) albums
United States National Recording Registry recordings
United States National Recording Registry albums